Jesús Javier Olalde Ortiz (born 5 May 1974) is a Mexican former footballer who played as a striker.

Career
Born in Mexico City, Olalde grew up supporting Club América. However, he began his professional football career with América's rival Pumas UNAM, where he became the leading scorer in league matches between Pumas and América with eight goals. He played for Tigres de la UANL, Atlante F.C. and Lobos de la BUAP before retiring.

International goals

Scores and results list Mexico's goal tally first.

References

External links

1974 births
Living people
Mexico under-20 international footballers
Mexico international footballers
Footballers from Mexico City
Association football forwards
Club Universidad Nacional footballers
Tigres UANL footballers
Atlante F.C. footballers
Lobos BUAP footballers
Liga MX players
Mexican footballers